Uqchi Bozorg (also Romanized as Ūqchī Bozorg) is a village in Tamran Rural District, in the Central District of Kalaleh County, Golestan Province, Iran. At the 2006 census, its population was 725, in 124 families.

References 

Populated places in Kalaleh County